John Laws Newton (25 May 1925 – 30 January 2010) was an English footballer who played as a wing-half for Hartlepools United from 1946 to 1958.

Newton began his career at Newcastle United, where he signed in 1944, never played for the Magpies in any official competition. He had guested for Hartlepools United during the war, and joined the Pools permanently in May 1946. He made his official debut for the club on 2 November 1946 against Halifax Town, and a regular in the Hartlepools side for the nest twelve seasons. 

He left Hartlepools in 1958 having made 361 appearances and scored 19 times, making him Hartlepool United's 11th highest appearance maker in the club's history. He later had a brief spell with non-League Ashington, before retiring from football to become a toolmaker. He died, aged 84, on 30 January 2010.

Career statistics
All appearances made by Jackie Newton:

References

1925 births
2010 deaths
English footballers
Newcastle United F.C. players
Hartlepool United F.C. players
Ashington A.F.C. players
Association football midfielders